In ancient Greece, a pinakion (pl. pinakia) was a small bronze or wooden plate used to identify a citizen of a city, a form of Citizens' token. Pinakia for candidates for political office or for jury membership were inserted into randomization machines (kleroteria). 

Identity documents
Athenian democracy